Ché was an American stoner rock band founded by former Kyuss drummers Brant Bjork and Alfredo Hernández, and former Unida bassist Dave Dinsmore. Ché released their only LP, Sounds of Liberation, in 2000.

Overview
Though best known at the time of the album's release as a drummer, Ché featured Bjork as the band's vocalist and guitarist. Another of Bjork's bands, Brant Bjork and the Bros, covered many of Ché's songs during their live performances, with Alfredo Hernández making occasional guest appearances with the band.

According to Bjork, he had been friends with Hernández and Dinsmore for years; they began playing together in the late 1990s after Hernández left Queens of the Stone Age.

Members
 Brant Bjork – vocals, guitar
 Dave Dinsmore – bass
 Alfredo Hernández – drums, percussion

Sounds of Liberation

Track listings

Vinyl

Credits
Recorded, mixed and mastered by Mathias Schneeberger
Produced by Ché and Mathias Schneeberger
Art concept by Ché
Band photo by Brian Maurer
All music by Ché

References

External links

American stoner rock musical groups
American musical trios